Mons Ganau is a mountain of the surface of the Moon. It is located inside King Crater, east of Mons Dieter. It has an altitude of about 7900 meters and a diameter of about 13 kilometers. The name, given in 1976, was derived from an African male name.

References

Mountains on the Moon